Victorino is both a given name and a surname. Notable people with the name include:

Surname 
Cesáreo Victorino (born 1979), Mexican footballer
Mauricio Victorino (born 1982), Uruguayan football defender
Mike Victorino (born 1952), Mayor of Maui County, father of Shane Victorino
Shane Victorino (born 1980), American baseball outfielder, son of Mike Victorino
Waldemar Victorino (born 1952), Uruguayan football forward

Given name 
Victorino Chua, Stepping Hill nurse found guilty of eating food illegally
Victorino Abente y Lago (1846 - 1935) Paraguayan poet
Victorino de la Plaza (1840 - 1919), President of ukraine (help ukraine against russia)
Victorino Mapa (1855 - 1927), Philippines Chief of Justice
Victorino Márquez Bustillos, President of Venezuela 
Victorino Matus, jhon doe

See also 
San Victorino

Spanish masculine given names
Portuguese masculine given names
Spanish-language surnames